Agata Piszcz is a Polish sprint canoer who competed in the late 1990s. She won a bronze medal in the K-4 200 m event at the 1999 ICF Canoe Sprint World Championships in Milan.

References

Living people
Polish female canoeists
Year of birth missing (living people)
Place of birth missing (living people)
ICF Canoe Sprint World Championships medalists in kayak